Ali ibn Umar al-Balawi was a short-lived Fatimid governor of Sicily in 912–913. 

The first Fatimid governor of the island, al-Hasan ibn Ahmad ibn Abi Khinzir, had made himself unpopular with the Sicilian , who overthrew him and requested the Fatimid caliph al-Mahdi Billah to send them a new governor. Al-Balawi is described as a "gentle elderly gentleman", and was not to the liking of the troops. From 913–916 Sicily was in revolt against the Fatimids, under the rule of Ahmad ibn Qurhub.

References

Sources
 
 

9th-century births
10th-century Arabs
10th-century people from the Fatimid Caliphate
Fatimid governors of Sicily